Kolonibidion femoratum is a species of beetle in the family Cerambycidae, the only species in the genus Kolonibidion.

References

Ibidionini
Monotypic beetle genera